Lucas Malvacini (born 20 November 1989) is a Brazilian model and theater and TV actor. He became known in 2013 for acting in the telenovela "Amor à Vida" of Rede Globo, and for acting in "Vai Que Cola", a television sitcom from Multishow.

Biography and career
In 2011, Lucas was invited to participate in the contest Mister Brazil 2011, he participated and won, competing with the model Renan Oliveira. Lucas has lived in Santiago, Milan and in Miami, currently living in Brazil. In 2013, he appeared in Rede Globo's telenovela "Viver à Vida", playing the character "Anjinho", lover of "Felix" and played by Matheus Solano. In 2015, Lucas Malvacini starred in the play "The Guest", where he was the main star of the plot. More recently, the model and actor was seen on Multishow's television sitcom "Vai Que Cola".

Filmography

References

External links
 

1989 births
Living people
People from Juiz de Fora
Brazilian male models